Faceted may refer to an object containing a facet.

Faceted may also refer to:
Faceted classification, organizational system allowing multiple characteristics or attributes of each item
Faceted search, technique for accessing information via faceted classification
Faceted striking platform

See also
Facet (disambiguation)